Dai Yi (born September 1926) is a Chinese historian who primarily focuses on the Qing dynasty's history. He is a professor at Renmin University of China. He is also the honorary director of the university's Qing dynasty's history institute as well as a doctoral student supervisor. Additionally, he is a member of the Communist Party of China.

Biography

Dai Yi was originally called Dai Bingheng. He was born in September 1926 in Changshu, Jiangsu. He once enrolled at the railway management college of Shanghai Jiao Tong University, but two years later, he was admitted into the history college of Peking University. During the War of Liberation, he took part in Gerakan Youth and Improvement Association. In 1948, he was wanted by the National Party of China. Additionally, with the help of the Communist Party of China, he escaped to Hua Bei University (the predecessor of Renmin University of China) where was charged by Communist Party of China. After graduation, he stayed in his university for his teaching career.

As of April 2020, Dai Yi is directing the effort to complete the History of Qing, a comprehensive compilation of the history of the Qing Dynasty.

Main works

中国近代史稿 (Modern History of China) (1958)
一六八九年中俄尼布楚条约 (Treaty of Nerchinsk in 1689) (1974)
简明清史I(A Concise History of Qing Dynasty I) (1980)
简明清史II(A Concise History of Qing Dynasty II) (1984)

References

Historians of China
1926 births
Writers from Suzhou
Living people
Republic of China historians
People's Republic of China historians
Academic staff of Renmin University of China
Educators from Suzhou
Historians from Jiangsu
National University of Peking alumni